Märten Kuusk (born 5 April 1996) is an Estonian professional footballer who plays as a centre back for Meistriliiga  club FC Flora (on loan from Újpest) and the Estonia national team.

Club career

Újpest
After leading FC Flora to their first ever European tournament group stage season and becoming the vice captain of the national team, on 25 January 2022 Kuusk signed for the Hungarian side Újpest on a 3.5 year contract. The transfer fee was not disclosed but was rumored to be a six figure sum.

International career
Kuusk made his senior international debut for Estonia on 15 January 2019, in a 0–0 friendly draw against Iceland.

Honours

Club
Nõmme Kalju II
Esiliiga B: 2013

Flora
Meistriliiga: 2017, 2019

References

External links

1996 births
Living people
Footballers from Tallinn
Estonian footballers
Association football defenders
Esiliiga players
Meistriliiga players
JK Tarvas Rakvere players
Nõmme Kalju FC players
FC Flora players
Estonia youth international footballers
Estonia under-21 international footballers
Estonia international footballers
Estonian expatriate footballers
Estonian expatriate sportspeople in Hungary
Expatriate footballers in Hungary
Újpest FC players
Nemzeti Bajnokság I players